The One New Zealand Party was a small political party in New Zealand. It was partly modeled on the Australian One Nation party, founded by Pauline Hanson. Its primary focus was on matters such as the Treaty of Waitangi, but its wider platform was broadly paleoconservative or producerist. It strongly opposed the policies of the government at the time, accusing it of giving special privileges to Māori and of undermining the concept of "one law for all". It claimed that the policies amount to a form of apartheid.

People involved with the party included Richard Fisher, John Porter, and Alan McCulloch, a former mayor of East Coast Bays.

One New Zealand was founded in 1999, and in the 1999 election, it won 0.06% of the vote. It had the shortest party list of any party in that election, with only one person, Walter Boyd. In the 2002 election, it won 0.09% of the vote. In the 2005 election, it won 0.02% of the vote.

In 2006, the party went into recess pending a decision as to whether the party would continue. In September, it was deregistered at its own request.

Electoral history

Parliament

See also
 1Law4All Party (2013–2015)
 Hobson's Pledge (2016–present)

References

Conservative parties in New Zealand
Right-wing populist parties
Far-right politics in New Zealand
Political parties established in 1999
Political parties disestablished in 2006
Defunct political parties in New Zealand
1999 establishments in New Zealand
2006 disestablishments in New Zealand